Boigu Island Airport  is an airport serving Boigu Island in Queensland, Australia. It was officially opened as the Charlie Gibuma Memorial Airstrip on 26 July 1981 by Hon. Ken Tomkins, then Queensland Minister for Aboriginal and Island Affairs. The airport is operated by the Torres Strait Islands Regional Council.

Facilities

See also 
 List of airports in Queensland

References

Airports in Queensland
Airports established in 1981
Torres Strait Islands communities